The Paper is a Chinese digital newspaper owned and run by the Shanghai United Media Group.

History
The Paper was launched in July 2014 as an offshoot of the Shanghai United Media Group publication Oriental Morning Post. It received a large amount of initial funding, speculated to be anywhere from US$16 million to 64 million. Of this, RMB 100 million (approximately $) was provided by the government through the Cyberspace Administration of China. 

The Paper was founded as an attempt to capture the readership of mobile internet users as revenue from mainstream physical papers across China saw major declines in the early 2010s.

In May 2016, The Paper launched Sixth Tone, an English-language sister publication.

Reporting
The Paper was given greater leeway in its reporting than other comparable organizations in China, where the government heavily censors and controls media. In allowing relative autonomy, the government aims to foster a media organization popular with younger online users that will still follow the political line of the Chinese Communist Party.

The Paper has focused in particular on investigative reporting. The day of its founding, it published a piece on judicial misconduct in Anhui province, prompting the Anhui High People's Court to reopen an investigation into the case. It has since become known for similar stories on societal scandals and corruption, including its series on Ling Jihua.

References

External links

Chinese news websites
Mass media in China
State media
Chinese Communist Party newspapers
Chinese propaganda organisations